The Deputy Prime Minister of Luxembourg is the second-highest position in the Luxembourgian cabinet.  The Deputy serves a vital function in Luxembourg's collegiate cabinet system, deputises for the Prime Minister when he is absent, represents his or her own political party, and holds other government positions.

Since the position was created, in 1959, almost all governments have been coalitions of two of the three major parties: the Christian Social People's Party (CSV), the Luxembourg Socialist Workers' Party (LSAP), and the Democratic Party (DP). The current government, however, consists of the LSAP, the DP and the Greens, a novelty. The Deputy Prime Minister has always been a leading politician from the junior coalition partner.

Since 1989, the title of Deputy Prime Minister has been an official one, although the position had been unofficially known by that name since its creation.  From the position's creation until 1989, the Deputy Prime Minister went by the name of the Vice-President of the Government.  This mirrored the Prime Minister's title, which was President of the Government until 1989.

List of deputy prime ministers

See also
 List of prime ministers of Luxembourg

Footnotes

References
 

List
Deputy Prime Minister
Luxembourg